Steroids (Crouching Tiger Hidden Gabber Megamix) is the third EP by the American experimental hip hop group Death Grips, self-released by the band on May 22, 2017. The piece, a mix of what appears to be 7 to 8 songs on a single track, has been described as a "barrage of noise".

The EP was later released for the first time physically on vinyl for Record Store Day 2019, featuring the previously YouTube-exclusive tracks "More Than the Fairy" and "Electronic Drum Solo (Dub Mix)" as B-sides.

Background
The band announced the EP on social media along with their then-unnamed sixth studio album Year of the Snitch, stating "we're working on the new death grips album. but in the meantime, here's a new track/mix. it's 22 minutes."

Track listing

Record Store Day LP

Personnel
Death Grips
 MC Ride - vocals
 Zach Hill - drums, production
 Andy Morin - production

Additional musician
 Les Claypool - bass on "More Than the Fairy"

References

2017 EPs
Death Grips albums
Self-released EPs